The 1999–2000 Season of BAI Basket (31st edition) ran from November 20, 2008 through May 16, 2000, with 8 teams playing in three different stages: in stage one (regular season) teams played a double round robin system. In stage two, the six best teams played a single round robin tournament in serie A and the last six did the same for the consolation group, serie B. Finally, in stage three (final four) the best four teams from serie A played in a round robin at four rounds for the title. The winners of the regular season and of the serie A are awarded a bonus point for the serie A and the final four, respectively.

BAI Basket Participants (1999–2000 Season)

BAI Basket Squads (1999–2000 Season)
BAI Basket Squads (1999–2000 Season)

Regular Season (November 20, 2000 – March 25, 2000)

Knockout stage

Final standings

See also
 2000 Angola Basketball Cup
 2000 Angola Basketball Super Cup
Federação Angolana de Basquetebol

External links
Official Website 
Eurobasket.com League Page

References

Angolan Basketball League seasons
League